KYMX (96.1 FM, "Mix 96") is a commercial radio station that is licensed to Sacramento, California, United States. The station is owned by Salt Lake City–based Bonneville International and broadcasts an adult contemporary format. KYMX's transmitter is located in Natomas and its studios are in North Sacramento.

KYMX broadcasts in HD Radio.

History
The station first signed on in March 1947 as KCRA-FM, when its founder Central Valleys Broadcasting Co. received a Federal Communications Commission (FCC) construction permit for a new class B FM station in Sacramento at 96.1 MHz. This new station was the FM adjunct to KCRA (1320 AM), which Central Valleys Broadcasting had launched two years earlier. In September 1968, KCRA-FM changed its call sign to KCTC and adopted a beautiful music format known as "California Sound".

On February 1, 1990, KCTC flipped to adult contemporary as KYMX, "Mix 96". The KCTC call letters and beautiful music format, in turn, moved to 1320 AM (now KIFM), replacing adult standards on that frequency.

On February 2, 2017, CBS Radio announced it would merge with Entercom (which locally owned KIFM, KKDO, KRXQ, KSEG, and KUDL; the company formerly owned KDND until it shut the station down and turned in its license to the FCC two days later). On October 10, CBS Radio announced that as part of the process of obtaining regulatory approval of the merger, KYMX would be one of sixteen stations that would be divested by Entercom, along with sister stations KHTK, KNCI, and KZZO (KSFM would be retained by Entercom).

Upon closure of the merger on November 17, 2017, Bonneville International began operating KYMX, KHTK, KNCI, and KZZO, as well as four other stations in San Francisco, under a local marketing agreement on behalf of the Entercom Divestiture Trust. In August 2018, Bonneville announced that it would acquire all eight stations outright for $141 million. The sale was completed on September 21, 2018.

HD Radio 
KYMX has two HD Radio digital subchannels:
KYMX-HD1 is a digital simulcast of the analog FM signal.
KYMX-HD2 airs a sports radio format as a simulcast of KHTK (1140 AM). The subchannel moved from KNCI-HD3 in August 2019.

References

External links

YMX
Mainstream adult contemporary radio stations in the United States
Radio stations established in 1947
1947 establishments in California
Bonneville International